Darkness Within may refer to:

 Darkness Within: In Pursuit of Loath Nolder, a 2007 first-person 3D adventure / horror thriller video game
Darkness Within 2: The Dark Lineage
 "Darkness Within" (song), a song by American heavy metal band Machine Head
 Darkness Within, a 2020 novel in the Warriors: The Broken Code series by Erin Hunter